Teleki is the name of an old Hungarian noble family whose members, for centuries, occupied many important positions in the Principality of Transylvania, in the Holy Roman Empire and later in the Austro-Hungarian Empire.

History
The family was originally called Garázda as they originated from Goražde, today's Bosnia and Hercegovina and was first mentioned in the 14th century. Szilágyi family is said to be collateral branch of this family. When Anna, the only member of one Székely branch of the Garázda family, married to Mihály Garázda, called Teleki, member of another existing family branch, their descendants left the name Garázda, and from then on they used the suffix Teleki de Szék. Members of the Teleki family bear the title Imperial Count which was given to them by Leopold I, Holy Roman Emperor in 1697.

Properties of Teleki family

Notable members of the family
 Teleki de Szék family
Count Mihály Teleki (1634–1690), Chancellor of Transylvania
 Count Sámuel Teleki (de Szék) (1739–1822), chancellor of Transylvania, founder of the Teleki library
Count Ádám Teleki de Szék (1789–1851), honvéd general in the revolution of 1848 (hu)
Count József Teleki de Szék (1790–1855),  jurist and historian,  first President of the Hungarian Academy of Sciences
Count László Teleki IV (de Szék) (1811–1861), politician and writer
Count Géza Teleki de Szék (1843–1913), Hungarian politician
 Count Sámuel Teleki (de Szék) (1845–1916), explorer
Countess Margit Teleki de Szék (1860–1922), Hungarian noblewoman and prime minister's wife
 Count Pál Teleki (de Szék) (1879–1941), prime minister of Hungary
Count Mihály Teleki de Szék (1896–1991), Hungarian politician
Count Géza Teleki de Szék (1911–1983), athlete, politician, academic geologist
 Pál Teleki (1906–1985), Hungarian footballer
 Gyula Teleki (born Tiegelmann, 1928), a Hungarian national football player, coach

Place names 
 Teleki, a village in Somogy county

Other
 Teleki(-Bolyai) Library (est. 1802)
Teleki Blanka Gymnasium (est. 1873), school in Budapest

See also 
 Telek, means "crossing"
List of titled noble families in the Kingdom of Hungary

External links 
 Sources regarding the history of the Teleki de Szék family

Hungarian-language surnames
 
Bulgarian noble families